Hemidactylus curlei, also known commonly as the northern leaf-toed gecko or Parker's gecko, is a species of lizard in the family Gekkonidae. The species is native to the Horn of Africa.

Etymology
The specific name, curlei, may be in honor of amateur naturalist A.T. Curle (died 1981), who was a consular official in Ethiopia and Somaliland.

Geographic range
H. curlei is found in Ethiopia and Somaliland.

Habitat

Description
Dorsally, H. curlei is yellowish with purplish black markings. Ventrally, it is white.

Reproduction
H. curlei is oviparous.

References

Further reading
Largen MJ, Spawls S (2010). Amphibians and Reptiles of Ethiopia and Eritrea. Frankfurt am Main: Edition Chimaira / Serpents Tale. 694 pp. . (Hemidactylus curlei, p. 294).
Loveridge A (1947). "Revision of the African Lizards of the Family Gekkonidae". Bulletin of the Museum of Comparative Zoölogy at Harvard College 98: 1–469 + Plates 1–7. (Hemidactylus curlei, pp. 162–163).
Parker HW (1942). "The Lizards of British Somaliland (With an appendix on Topography and Climate by Capt. R. H. R. Taylor, O. B. E.)". Bulletin of the Museum of Comparative Zoölogy at Harvard College 91 (1): 1–101. (Hemidactylus curlei, new species, p. 24).
Rösler H (2000). "Kommentierte Liste der rezent, subrezent und fossil bekannten Geckotaxa (Reptilia: Gekkonomorpha)". Gekkota 2: 28–153. (Hemidactylus curlei, p. 85). (in German).

curlei
Reptiles of Ethiopia
Reptiles of Kenya
Reptiles described in 1942
Taxa named by Hampton Wildman Parker